Georges Demenÿ (12 June 1850 in Douai – 26 October 1917 in Paris) was a French inventor, chronophotographer, filmmaker, gymnast and physical fitness enthusiast.

Main publications 
L’Éducation physique en Suède, Paris, Société d'éditions scientifiques, 1892
Guide du maître chargé de l'enseignement des exercices physiques dans les écoles publiques et privées, Paris, Société d'éditions scientifiques, 1900
Les Bases scientifiques de l’éducation physique, Paris, Félix Alcan, 1902
Physiologie des professions. Le violoniste, art, mécanisme, hygiène, Paris, A. Maloine, 1905
Cours supérieur d'éducation physique, avec Jean Philippe et Georges-Auguste Racine, Paris, Félix Alcan, 1905
Mécanisme et éducation des mouvements, Paris, Félix Alcan, 1904; 1905
Danses gymnastiques composées pour les établissements d'enseignement primaire et secondaire de jeunes filles, avec A. Sandoz, 1908
Les Origines du cinématographe, Paris, H. Paulin, 1909
Science et art du mouvement. Éducation physique de la jeune fille. Éducation et harmonie des mouvements, Paris, Librairie des annales, 1911; 1920
L’Éducation de l’effort, Paris, Félix Alcan, 1914 Texte en ligne
Éducation physique des adolescents. Préparation sportive par la méthode synthétique avec l'art de travailler, Paris, Félix Alcan, 1917

External links 
    
 
 Selected Georges Demenÿ's works  digitized by the BIUM(Bibliothèque interuniversitaire de médecine et d'odontologie, Paris)

1850 births
1917 deaths
19th-century French photographers
Burials at Montmartre Cemetery
19th-century French inventors
People associated with physical culture
People from Douai
Pioneers of photography